Datuk Husam bin Musa (Jawi: حسام بن موسى; born 14 October 1959) is a Malaysian politician who served as Vice-President of the National Trust Party (AMANAH), a component party of the opposition Pakatan Harapan (PH) coalition and Senator from September 2018 to September 2021.

Biography
Husam Musa was born at Kampung Kota, Kota Bharu, in the state of Kelantan, Malaysia.

He went to Sekolah Rendah Kota, Kota Bharu (1965–1971), Sekolah Menengah Sultan Ismail, Kota Bharu (1972–1975), Maktab Sultan Ismail (1976–1979). Later, he gained his Degree in Economics at University of Malaya (1980–1983). He studied Arabic in Jordan in 1987.

At University of Malaya, he was active in student activities, serving as council member of PMUM in 1981–82 when Ahmad Shabery Cheek served as president. He also served as Secretary General of PBMUM.

Husam's early career included a stint as Harakah journalist in 1985 and in 1990–1993 he was the Press Secretary to the Menteri Besar of Kelantan Dato' Nik Abdul Aziz Nik Mat. In 1993–1999 he was appointed political secretary to the Menteri Besar.

He is married to Rohana Abd Rahman and they have seven sons.

Political career
Previously he was the Pan-Malaysian Islamic Party (PAS) Vice-President, from 2011 until 2015. On 6 May 2016, he was sacked from PAS by the party's disciplinary committee for alleged misconduct.

Husam as a PAS member, was the former Kelantan State Legislative Assemblyman for the Salor constituency (2008-2018) and Kijang constituency (2004-2008). He was also the federal Member of Parliament for Kubang Kerian in 1999–2004. His tenure as Member of Parliament gave him the prominence as a very capable politician in Malaysia and he received the accolade as "Newsmaker of the Year 2003" (malaysiakini.com) for his tenacity to bring up issues of public interest. Beside contesting and winning the Salor state seat in the 2013 Malaysian general election, he also contested the parliamentary seat of Putrajaya but had lost to Barisan Nasional's Tengku Adnan Mansor.

In the 2018 Malaysian general election, under his new party AMANAH he contested but lost both the Kota Bharu parliamentary seat and Salor state seat.

Election results

Honours
Husam was earlier conferred the Dato' Paduka Jiwa Mahkota Kelantan award which carry the title Dato when he was an exco in 2006 by the previous Sultan Ismail Petra of Kelantan but the award was revoked by his son, Sultan Muhammad V in February 2018. On 13 October 2018, Husam was awarded Darjah Mulia Seri Melaka by Tuan Yang Terutama Yang Dipertua Negeri Melaka which carry the title Datuk.
  :
  (2006, revoked 7 February 2018)
  :
  Companion Class I of the Exalted Order of Malacca (DMSM) – Datuk' (2018)

External links
 Official site

References

1959 births
Living people
People from Kota Bharu
People from Kelantan
Malaysian people of Malay descent
Malaysian Muslims
Malaysian journalists
Former Malaysian Islamic Party politicians
Independent politicians in Malaysia
Members of the Dewan Rakyat
Members of the Dewan Negara
Members of the Kelantan State Legislative Assembly
Kelantan state executive councillors
University of Malaya alumni
21st-century Malaysian politicians
National Trust Party (Malaysia) politicians